Hosur division is a revenue division in Tamil Nadu, India.

References 
 

Krishnagiri district